Tapinoma andamanense is a species of ant in the genus Tapinoma. Described by Forel in 1903, the species is endemic to India.

References

Tapinoma
Hymenoptera of Asia
Insects of India
Insects described in 1903